UFC on ABC: Ortega vs. Rodríguez (also known as UFC on ABC 3) was a mixed martial arts event produced by the Ultimate Fighting Championship that took place on July 16, 2022, at UBS Arena in Elmont, New York in the United States.

Background
A featherweight bout between former UFC Featherweight Championship challenger Brian Ortega and The Ultimate Fighter: Latin America featherweight winner Yair Rodríguez headlined the event.

A flyweight bout between former UFC Flyweight Championship challenger Alex Perez and Askar Askarov was expected to take place at the event. The pair was previously scheduled to meet at UFC on ESPN: Hall vs. Strickland in July 2021, but Askarov pulled out citing injury. Askarov pulled out once again in early June due to undisclosed reasons and Perez was rescheduled against Alexandre Pantoja at UFC 277.

A women’s strawweight bout between former UFC Women's Strawweight Championship challenger and inaugural Invicta FC Atomweight Champion Jessica Penne and former Invicta FC Strawweight Champion Brianna Fortino was expected to take place at the event. However, Fortino withdrew in early June for unknown reasons and was replaced by another former Invicta FC Strawweight Champion in Emily Ducote.

A women's flyweight bout between former Strikeforce and UFC Women's Bantamweight Champion Miesha Tate and former Invicta FC Bantamweight Champion (also former UFC Women's Flyweight Championship challenger) Lauren Murphy was originally expected for UFC on ESPN: Błachowicz vs. Rakić but was then shifted to UFC 276 for unknown reasons. In turn, a week before that event, Murphy pulled out after she tested positive for COVID-19. They were then rescheduled for this event.

A couple of featherweight bouts featuring Bill Algeo vs. Billy Quarantillo and Herbert Burns vs. Khusein Askhabov were scheduled for this event. However, after both Quarantillo and Askhabov pulled out due to injury, Burns and Algeo were booked against each other.

Philip Rowe and Abubakar Nurmagomedov were expected to meet in a welterweight contest. However, the pairing was cancelled due to complications on both sides. Rowe has been forced to withdraw due to an injury, while Nurmagomedov pulled out due to alleged visa issues which restricted his travel.

Results

Bonus awards
The following fighters received $50,000 bonuses.
 Fight of the Night: Matt Schnell vs. Su Mudaerji
 Performance of the Night:  Amanda Lemos, Li Jingliang, Punahele Soriano, Ricky Simón, Bill Algeo, and Dustin Jacoby

See also 

 List of UFC events
 List of current UFC fighters
 2022 in UFC

References 

UFC on ABC
Mixed martial arts in New York (state)
2022 in mixed martial arts
July 2022 sports events in the United States
2022 in sports in New York (state)
Events in Elmont, New York
Events on Long Island
Sports in Long Island